Ararat (stylized as ArArAt) is a brand of Armenian brandy produced by the Yerevan Brandy Company since 1887. It is made from white grapes and spring water, according to a traditional method. The brand's "ordinary brandies" are aged between 3 and 6 years. Its "aged brandies" are between 10 and 30 years old.

Ararat brandy is primarily sold in countries of the former Soviet Union, chief among them Russia, Georgia, Ukraine and Belarus. In the Russian-speaking countries of the former Soviet Union, the Armenian brandy is marketed as cognac. In 1900, the brandy won the Grand-prix award in Paris that allowed Ararat to legally call their brandy "cognac" until it was revoked after WWII. The term "brandy" has never really caught on in the region.

In politics

An undocumented anecdote claims that during the Yalta Conference, Winston Churchill was so impressed with the Armenian brandy Dvin given to him by Joseph Stalin that he asked for several cases of it to be sent to him each year. Reportedly 400 bottles of Dvin were shipped to Churchill annually. This brandy was named in honour of the ancient capital Dvin, and was first produced in 1943.

During a 2013 meeting at his personal villa in Sochi, Russian president Vladimir Putin gave British Prime Minister David Cameron a bottle of Armenian brandy as a gift, recalling Stalin's offering to Churchill in 1945.

Brands
Ararat Erebuni, collection 30, 50 and 70 years old.
Ararat Nairi, 20 years old.
Ararat, 3 and 5 years old.
Ararat Akhtamar, 10 years old.
Ararat Otborny, 7 years old.
Ararat Ani, 7 years old.
Ararat Dvin, 25 years old.
Ararat Armenia, collection.
Ararat Vaspurakan, 15 years old.

Retired brands include:
Ararat Tonakan, 15 years old.
Ararat Kilikia, 30 years old.
Ararat Sparapet, 40 years old.
Ararat Noah's Ark, 70 years old.

See also
Noy (brandy)
Yerevan Brandy Company

References

External links
 Pernod Ricard Armenia 
 Yerevan Brandy Company
 Vinorium (UK) Ltd.

1887 introductions
Soviet cuisine
Armenian distilled drinks
Brandies
Pernod Ricard brands
Armenian brands
Soviet brands
Armenian drinks